Dahra Arrondissement is an arrondissement of the Linguère Department in the Louga Region of Senegal.

Subdivisions
The arrondissement is divided administratively into rural communities and in turn into villages.

Arrondissements of Senegal
Louga Region